Clements Worldwide, originally Clements & Company and later Clements International, is a global insurance company founded in 1947 and headquartered in Washington, D.C. with offices in London and Dubai. It provides international insurance to expatriates, international organizations, international schools, relief organizations, contractors and medical tourists. Clients include contractors serving in Iraq and Afghanistan.

History
Founded as a domestic insurance company, Clements & Company was established in 1947 by the husband and wife team of Robert S. Clements and M. Juanita Guess-Clements. The company found a niche serving clients in government. Later it moved to serving those in the United States Foreign Service, and in the late 1970s began focusing on expatriate clients.  In 1991, Mike Judge was an intern at Clements and is said to have gotten the idea for "Beavis" at the exclusive annual holiday party. The name was changed to Clements International in 2001.

Cofounder Robert S. Clements died in 2007. The company joined the Council of Insurance Agents and Brokers (CIAB) in 2008.

Clements provides Defense Base Act (DBA) insurance  and other insurance products for contractors working for the U.S. government and others around the world.

Following the establishment of the company's first wholly owned international subsidiary in London in 2010, Clements International rebranded and became Clements Worldwide in 2011. On March 20, 2013, Clements Worldwide opened its third international office, in Dubai.

In 2010, Clements became licensed by the UK's Financial Services Authority (FSA) following its acquisition of the International Vehicle Risk Management (IVRM) business from Lockton Companies.

On February 20, 2013, Clements Worldwide announced its acquisition of UK-based expat insurance provider Italsure.

Products and Services
Clements Worldwide offers personal and commercial insurance products, including car, property, life, health, and specialty and high-risk insurance such as kidnap & ransom and political violence.

Current Leadership
Jon B. Clements - Chairman & Chief Executive Officer (son of the founder)
Tarun Chopra - President
Dan Tuman - President

Charitable Giving
Clements Worldwide's annual “Expat Youth Scholarship” awards a total of $10,000 in scholarship to six students, ages 13–18 of any nationality who have resided in a foreign country for at least two consecutive years. Every year there is a different theme delineating how a youth has benefitted from living overseas.
The 2013 prize award is for students who create a two-minute video demonstrating how they can make the world a better place through their experiences abroad.
The 2012 theme tasked students to send a photo with a short essay that captures a ‘calculated’ risk they took while living abroad.

Since 1995, Clements Worldwide has sponsored the M. Juanita Guess Award (named after Clements’ co-founder). ”The M. Juanita Guess Award is conferred on a Community Liaison Officer who has demonstrated outstanding leadership, dedication, initiative, or imagination in assisting the families of Americans serving an overseas post.” 

Clements Worldwide sponsors the annual Foreign Service Youth Foundation (FYSF) community award for U.S. Foreign Service youth volunteering their efforts to improve the community. The winners receive a certificate of recognition for their respective philanthropic work, as well as a $1,500 savings bond at the annual award (FYSF) ceremony, hosted at the U.S. Department of State.

References

External links
Clements Worldwide official website

Insurance companies based in Washington, D.C.
Financial services companies established in 1947
1947 establishments in Washington, D.C.
Companies based in Washington, D.C.
American companies established in 1947